Jacas Grande District is one of eleven districts of the Huamalíes Province in Peru.

Geography 
Other mountains are listed below:

Ethnic groups 
The people in the district are mainly indigenous citizens of Quechua descent. Quechua is the language which the majority of the population (80.07%) learnt to speak in childhood, 19.22% of the residents started speaking using the Spanish language (2007 Peru Census).

See also 
 Awkin Punta

References